Red Mecca is the third studio album by English band Cabaret Voltaire. It was released in September 1981, through record label Rough Trade.

Background 
While touring the USA in November 1979, Cabaret Voltaire became strongly interested in the rise of the Christian right and its use of television, especially the fund-raising broadcasts of TV evangelist Eugene Scott. They compared this to the rise of Islamism, devoting a side to each strand of religious politics on their 1980 mini-album Three Mantras. Red Mecca was a culmination of this interest. According to Richard H. Kirk: "The whole Afghanistan situation was kicking off, Iran had the American hostages [...] we were taking notice [...] it's not called [Red Mecca] by coincidence. We weren't referencing the fucking Mecca Ballroom in Nottingham!"

Red Mecca was recorded at Western Works, Sheffield in May 1981.

Release 
Red Mecca reached No. 1 on the UK Independent Albums chart.

Critical reception 

NME named Red Mecca the ninth best album of 1981.

Andy Kellman of AllMusic retrospectively praised the album, writing, "Unlike a fair portion of CV's studio output, Red Mecca features no failed experiments or anything that could be merely cast off as 'interesting.' It's a taught , dense, horrific slab lacking a lull." Uncut cited Red Mecca as Cabaret Voltaire's "masterpiece", where the band "struck the perfect balance between experimentalism and entryism". Record Collectors Ian Shirley called it "a seismic release" and noted "its timeless sheen, with the Cabs' use of echo, space and phasing lending depth and vibrancy to the album." In 2019, Pitchfork ranked Red Mecca as the fourth best industrial album of all time.

Track listing

Personnel 
 Cabaret Voltaire

 Christopher R. Watson – organ, tape, production, recording, sleeve design
 Richard H. Kirk – synthesizer, guitar, clarinet, horns, strings, production, recording, sleeve design
 Stephen Mallinder – vocals, bass guitar, bongos, production, recording, sleeve design

 Additional personnel

 Nik Allday – drums
 Porky – mastering
 Neville Brody – sleeve design

References

External links 
 

1981 albums
Cabaret Voltaire (band) albums
Music in Sheffield
Rough Trade Records albums